Dr. K. Ayyappa Paniker, sometimes spelt "Ayyappa Panicker" (12 September 1930 – 23 August 2006), was a Malayalam poet, literary critic, and an academic and a scholar in modern and post-modern literary theories as well as ancient Indian aesthetics and literary traditions. He was one of the pioneers of modernism in Malayalam poetry, where his seminal works like Kurukshethram (1960), is considered a turning point in Malayalam poetry. Many of Ayyappa Paniker's poems and his several essays were an important influence on later generations of Malayalam writers.

In an academic career which ran in consonance with his literary one, and spanned four decades, he taught in various colleges and universities before retiring as the Director, Institute of English, University of Kerala. He published over 25 works, translated several important work to Malayalam, including Guru Granth Sahib and a book in French; as a scholarly editor he produced numerous anthologies on Indian literature, he was the chief editor of the Sahitya Akademi's Indian Literary Encyclopaedia. Another important work by him Indian Narratology, published by IGNCA, was the first of its kind to study various forms of the art of narration, in Indian literature, starting with Vedic and oral literature to Buddhist and contemporary literature.

Early life and education
Paniker (his preferred spelling) was born in Kavalam near Alappuzha to E. Naryanan of Periyamana Illam, and M. Meenakshiamma. Fourth of the eight children, six of them girls, he grew up without any paternal affection, while his mother died when he was 12 years old, this early anguish and solitude deeply reflected in his poetry, which he started writing when he was in high school.

The Kavalam village, was also home to people like, K. M. Panikkar, historian and administrator, and playwright and poet, Kavalam Narayana Panicker, his cousin. He published his first poem at the age of 16, published in the Mathrubhoomi Weekly. He did his Intermediate at Malabar Christian College, Kozhikode, and BA Honours in English Literature at the University College, Thiruvananthapuram in 1951, thereafter he received his master's degree from the University of Kerala.

Paniker took his doctorate from Indiana University with a doctoral dissertation on the poetry of Robert Lowell, supervised by Prof. Robert E. Gross, subsequently he did post-doctoral research in Yale and Harvard University (1981–82).

Career

Paniker joined CMS College, Kottayam as a lecturer of English in 1951, after working there for a year, he joined the Mahatma Gandhi College, Thiruvananthapuram. He started teaching at the University College, in Thiruvananthapuram in 1952, and did so until 1965. At this point, he became a Professor at the Institute of English and Head of the department in University of Kerala (1965–74). In 1974, he became Reader in English, at the Institute of English under University of Kerala, a post he held till 1980, when he became Dean of Faculty of Arts in the University of Kerala, he retired in 1990.

Through his long career he lectured in many national and international universities, including around 25 universities in US, where came across poets James Dickey, John Hollander, Czeslaw Milosz and Allen Ginsberg.

Awards and recognition
Paniker was a recipient of a number of honours including the Padma Shri, Kerala Sahitya Akademi award for poetry and criticism, Kendriya Sahitya Akademi Award for poetry, 2005 Saraswati Samman for his collection of writings Ayyappa Panikerude Krithikal, Distinguished Teacher award, Mahakavi Ulloor award for poetry, Kabir Samman, International Man of the Year (IBC, Cambridge, UK), Indira Gandhi Memorial Fellowship with lead to the book, Indian Narratology published by IGNCA, Gangadhar Meher National Award for poetry, Asan Prize and Jana Sanskriti Award (Abu Dhabi), Vayalar Award, Pandalam Keralavarma award and Vallathol Award.2015 was conducted in memory of him.

Personal life
He died in Thiruvananthapuram (Trivandrum) on 23 August 2006 at the age of 76 and was survived by his wife and two children. He was cremated the following day in his native village, Kavalam, in a plot he had set apart twelve years ago for the purpose, on the western side of his traditional family house, Olickal tharavad. The house finds reference in several of his works, especially in his poem 'Kavalam' in the anthology Pathumanippookkal.

Legacy
Ayyapa Foundation was formed in 2006 in Thiruvananthapuram, to promote his work and Malayalam poetry. The January 2007 issue of journal Samyukta, was dedicated entirely to him, it contained 10 critical essays on him and his work, besides three collections of his verse in English translation, one of which, Poetry at Midnight published for the first time. It also contained a 36-page bibliography of his oeuvre. In September 2009, Sitakant Mahapatra delivered the "Ayyappa Paniker commemorative speech 2009" at Thiruvananthapuram. The popular poetry journal Poetry Chain was established by Gopi Kottoor in memory of Ayyappa Paniker.

Bibliography
 Selected poems of Ayyappa Paniker. Modern Book Centre, 1985.
 Indian Renaissance. Facet Books. 1988. .
 A perspective of Malayalam literature. Annu Chithra Publications, 1990.
 Kathakali, the art of the non-worldly, with D. Appukuttan Nair, Pankaj Shah, Sangeet Natak Akademi. Marg Publications, 1993. .
 Indian Narratology. Indira Gandhi National Centre for the Arts, Sterling Publishers. 2003. .
 Agnipujayum Mattu Pradana Kavithakalum (Malayalam). Dc Books. .
 Ayyappapanikerute Krithikal Vol 1 (1951–1969) (Malayalam). Dc Books. .
 Ayyappapanikerute Krithikal Vol 2 (1969–1981) (Malayalam). Dc Books. .
 Ayyappapanikerute Krithikal Vol 3 (1981–1989) (Malayalam). Dc Books. .
 Ayyappapanikerute Krithikal Vol 4 (1990–1999) (Malayalam). Dc Books. .
 Ayyappapanikerute Kavitakal Vol 5 (2000–2006) (Malayalam). Dc Books. (Last poems, written during 2000–2006 compiled by his daughter Kumari M.).
 Viswasahithyanglilute-1  (Malayalam). Dc Books. .
 Viswasahithyanglilute-2 (Malayalam). Dc Books. .
 Poetry at Midnight (Tr of Pathumanippookkal) Tr by P Ravindran Nayar, FOLIO,2010,

Edited anthologies
 Malayalam Short Stories: Anthology. Vikas Publishing. 1982. .
 Modern Indian Poetry in English. Sahitya Akademi. 1989. .
 Indian English literature since independence. Indian Association for English Studies, 1991. .
 Narrating Colonialism by D. Maya. Prestige Books. 1997. .
 Medieval Indian literature: An Anthology, Volume 1. Sahitya Akademi. 1997. .
 Indian English Literature Since Independence. Stosius Inc/Advent Books Division. 1997. .
 Medieval Indian Literature: An Anthology, Selections (Maithili-Punjabi) Volume 3. Sahitya Akademi, 1999. .

Further reading
 
 A Short History of Malayalam Literature by Ayyappa Paniker, 2nd revis. ed. 2005
 Modern Malayalam Literature: Introduction by Ayyappa Paniker Modern Indian literature, an Anthology, Volume 2. Sahitya Akademi. 1992. . p. 231.
 Commonwealth literature, themes and techniques: essays in honour of Prof. K. Ayyappa Paniker, ed. P. K. Ranjan. Ajanta Publications, 1993. .
 
 Poetry at Midnight (Tr of Pathumanippookkal), Tr by P Ravindran Nayar, F O L I O, pub 2010,

References

External links
 K. Ayyappa Paniker, website 

 Tribute in the Hindu

1930 births
2006 deaths
Recipients of the Saraswati Samman Award
Recipients of the Padma Shri in literature & education
Recipients of the Sahitya Akademi Award in Malayalam
Recipients of the Gangadhar National Award
University of Kerala alumni
Indiana University alumni
Harvard University alumni
Malayali people
Scholars from Kerala
Malayalam-language writers
Malayalam poets
Academic staff of the University of Kerala
Malayalam literary critics
Poets from Kerala
20th-century Indian translators
Literary theorists
University College Thiruvananthapuram alumni
Recipients of the Kerala Sahitya Akademi Award
Malabar Christian College alumni
20th-century Indian poets
People from Alappuzha district
Indian male poets
20th-century Indian male writers